Verkhneye Myachkovo (Russian: Верхнее Мячково) is a rural locality (a selo) in Ramensky District in Moscow Oblast. Population: 618 inhibitions (2010). The distance to the town Ramenskoye is about 20 km and the distance to Moscow is about 22 km.

Population

References

Notes

Rural localities in Moscow Oblast